Sangachin (also Romanized as Sangāchīn; also known as Sangar Chīn, Sangarchīn, and Sankāchīn) is a village in Chahar Farizeh Rural District, in the Central District of Bandar-e Anzali County, Gilan Province, Iran. At the 2006 census, its population was 2,421, in 708 families.

References 

Populated places in Bandar-e Anzali County